Highs in the Mid-Sixties, Volume 14 (subtitled The Northwest, Part 2) is a compilation album in the Highs in the Mid-Sixties series, featuring recordings that were released in Washington and Oregon.  Highs in the Mid-Sixties, Volume 7 and Highs in the Mid-Sixties, Volume 16 are other volumes in the series that feature bands from these states.

Release data
This album was released in 1985 as an LP by AIP Records (somewhat out of order, as #AIP-10020).

Notes on the tracks
With its moaning saxophone and infectious beat, the instrumental that starts the album, "Wolf Call" would feel right at home on the Born Bad Series. "Sorry Charlie" is a take-off on the long-running series of Charlie the Tuna commercials for StarKist Tuna, complete with faux British accents.

Side one, track 6 is incorrectly credited to "The Statics." The actual artists are Merrilee & the Turnabouts, featuring Merrilee Rush.

Track listing

Side 1

 Lord Dent & His Invaders: "Wolf Call" (Clayton Watson)
 The Night People: "Istanbul" (Simon/Kennedy)
 The Volk Brothers: "Wash Don't Soak" (Val Volk/Jimmy Volk)
 The Paymarks: "Louise" (Mike Spotts)
 J. Michael & the Bushmen: "I Need Love" (J. Michael)
 Merrilee & the Turnabouts: "Tell Me the Truth" (Merrilee Rush/Gerber)
 The Talismen: "She Was Good" (Wood Cooper)

Side 2
 Sir Raleigh & the Cupons: "Tomorrow's Gonna Be Another Day" (Steve Venet/Tommy Boyce)
 Jack Bedient & the Chessmen: "Rapunzel" (Jack Bedient)
 Tom Thumb & the Casuals: "I Should Know" (Brad Miller) — rel. 1965
 The Scotsmen: "Tuff Enough" (R. Shomer/G. Reynolds) — rel. 1965
 The Scotsmen: "Sorry, Charlie" (R. Shomer/Lucas/G. Reynolds) — rel. 1965
 The Rooks: "Bound to Lose" (J. Richie/R. Dangel) — rel. 1965
 The Rooks: "Gimme a Break" (J. Richie/R. Dangel/B. Webb) — rel. 1965

Music of Oregon
Pebbles (series) albums
1985 compilation albums
Music of Washington (state)